Toni Kuivasto (born 31 December 1975 in Tampere) is a retired Finnish footballer who last played for Veikkausliigaside FC Haka.

Club career
Kuivasto started his career at home-town club FC Ilves, making his Veikkausliiga debut in 1992. He also played for MyPa and HJK Helsinki in Finland, before moving abroad to play for Viking FK of the Norwegian Tippeligaen in 2001. After a few years in Norway he wanted new challenges, and he was bought by Djurgården in the summer of 2003. Kuivasto has helped Djurgården to two Swedish championships and two Swedish Cups. Kuivasto returned to Finland for the 2010 season after spending 10 years abroad. He signed a one-year contract with FC Haka. He managed to score a vital goal for his team in his second game for Haka, in a league cup match against VPS.

After his contract with Haka expired after the 2010 season, he became a free agent. On 4 November 2011 it was announced that the 35-year-old Kuivasto would retire due his knee problems. He is currently studying to become a youth coach.

International career
Kuivasto made his debut for the Finnish national team on 21 February 1997 against Malaysia. He made his last national appearance on 1 April 2009 as he played 23 minutes in a friendly against Norway. He made in total of 75 national caps and scored one goal.

Honours

Club 
 Djurgårdens IF 
 Allsvenskan (2): 2003, 2005

References

External links
  Official FC Haka profile
  Profile at FA of Finland's official website
 National Football Teams

1975 births
Living people
Finnish footballers
Finland international footballers
Finland under-21 international footballers
Association football central defenders
Veikkausliiga players
Eliteserien players
Myllykosken Pallo −47 players
Helsingin Jalkapalloklubi players
Viking FK players
Djurgårdens IF Fotboll players
Allsvenskan players
FC Ilves players
Finnish expatriate footballers
Expatriate footballers in Sweden
Expatriate footballers in Norway
Finnish expatriate sportspeople in Sweden
Finnish expatriate sportspeople in Norway
Footballers from Tampere